Frank O. Brookhouser (1912–1975) was an American journalist and writer.

Brookhouser began his career in journalism as an editor (1932–1935) for his hometown paper, the Ford City News.  He became sports editor (1935–1936) at the Monongahela Daily Republican in Monongahela, Pennsylvania, then landed a beat reporting job in Philadelphia in 1936 at the Philadelphia Evening Bulletin. The Philadelphia Inquirer hired him in 1939, where he became a popular columnist. He moved his column, "A Man about Town", back to the Philadelphia Evening Bulletin in 1953 for the remainder of his journalism career. In the 1950s he also did weekly television show and a daily evening radio show.

Brookhouser's columns were re-edited into his book portrait of Philadelphia, Our Philadelphia, the first sentence of which pays tribute to typesetters Hubert Blaine Wolfe­schlegel­stein­hausen­berger­dorff and Benjamin Franklin as exemplar Philadelphians. While writing "A Man about Town", Brookhouser had previously attracted national attention by omitting the letter "u" (and being promptly corrected) in reporting Wolfe­schlegel­stein­hausen­berger­dorff's 1952 voter registration under the 35-letter surname.

As well as journalism, Brookhouser published hundreds of short stories and one novel.

He was born to Walter L. and Miriam Fischer Brookhouser in Ford City, Pennsylvania. He graduated from Ford City High School and Temple University in Philadelphia where he was a member of Sigma Pi fraternity. In 1939 he married Helen E. Hanway. He served in the U. S. Army for three years during World War II.

Works
Request for Sherwood Anderson, short stories (Denver: Alan Swallow, 1947)
She Made the Big Town, short stories (New York: Twayne Publishers, 1952)
Now I Lay Me Down, novel (Denver: Alan Swallow, 1955)
Our Philadelphia: A Candid and Colorful Portrait of a Great City, newspaper columns (Garden City: Doubleday, 1957)
These Were Our Years, anthology (Garden City: Doubleday, 1959)
This Was Your War, anthology (Garden City: Doubleday, 1960)

References
Contemporary Authors Online. The Gale Group, 2002. PEN (Permanent Entry Number):  0000074923.

1912 births
1975 deaths
People from Ford City, Pennsylvania
Writers from Pittsburgh
Temple University alumni
American male journalists
20th-century American novelists
American male novelists
American male short story writers
20th-century American short story writers
20th-century American journalists
United States Army personnel of World War II
20th-century American male writers
Novelists from Pennsylvania